Ambika Dutt Ranga (19 September 1919 – 10 January 1990) was an Indian footballer. Born in Bikaner, he played for Mohammedan Sporting Club and the India national team.

References

Rajasthani people
1919 births
1990 deaths
Indian footballers
People from Bikaner
Footballers from Rajasthan
Association footballers not categorized by position